Dooley's is a German cream liqueur combining toffee and vodka, made by BEHN in Eckernförde. It is marketed in a red and blue opaque bottle. The liqueur itself is a creamy colour.

Ingredients 
 Vodka
 Cream
 Sugar
 Milk
 Flavoring

Alcohol content is 17 percent ABV.

Drinks 
One of the best-known cocktails made with Dooley's is the 101 milkshake (also known as The Reykjavík Milkshake):
 2 Scoops Vanilla Ice Cream
 6cl Dooley's
Stirred into a milkshake.

External links 
 Official site

Cream liqueurs
German liqueurs
German brands